The FIA World Rallycross Championship (official abbreviation is World RX) is a rallycross series organised by the FIA in conjunction with series promoter Rallycross Promoter GmbH (founded by Red Bull and KW25). From the inaugural season in 2014 to 2020, sanctioning was shared with IMG Motorsport.

Format

The series currently consists of 12 two-day events driven on closed circuits with mixed surface (mostly asphalt and gravel). Each event consists of:

 4 Qualifying heats. In each of the 4 series there are smaller races containing 3 to 5 cars, and the driver with the fastest overall race time after 4 laps (including one Joker Lap) is declared the qualifying winner of Q1, Q2, Q3 and/or Q4. Drivers earn 'intermediate points' based on their positions. After the 4 qualifying series, the points are added up and the 12 drivers with the most points in the 'intermediate standings' move into the next round.
 2 Semi-Finals. 6 cars race in each of both semi-finals, which are run over 6 laps (incl. one Joker Lap). The top 3 drivers in each semi-final move into the final round.
 Final. Like the semi-finals, this race is contested by 6 cars over 6 laps (incl. one Joker Lap). The winner of the final is deemed to be the event winner. However, the final winner has not necessarily claimed the most championship points from the whole event.

Categories
During the first FIA World Rallycross Championship season in 2014, two classes were run, Supercar (later RX1) and the supporting RX Lites series (later RX2). RX Lites teams raced identical cars prepared by OlsbergsMSE. The World RX Championship series was introduced to distinguish it from the FIA European Rallycross Championship, which has been contested since 1976 and was renamed in March 2013.

An electric category was planned to be introduced in 2020, but it was announced in August 2018 that the introduction of a fully electric Championship would be delayed until 2021 to allow manufacturers more time to submit an interest to join following the rules change. Instead, the Projekt E class was run in 2020 as a special parallel series using a spec racer. The Projekt E spec electric rallycross car was revealed in September 2019 at the Riga Motor Museum in Latvia. FIA announced in August 2020 that RX2e would be replacing the RX2 category for the 2021 season. The top World Rallycross Championship series switched to electric cars (RX1e) in August 2022, making World RX an all-electric race series.

For 2022, there are two World Rallycross Championships and two European Rallycross Championships:
 FIA World Rallycross Championship, using cars from the RX1e class
 FIA Euro RX1 Rallycross Championship, using cars from the RX1 class
 FIA RX2e Rallycross Championship, using cars from the RX2e class
 FIA Euro RX3 Rallycross Championship, using cars from the RX3 class

Notes

Internal combustion
They are four-wheel-drive, and use a Sadev 6-speed sequential gearbox.

They are also four-wheel-drive, and also use a 6-speed sequential gearbox.

They are only two-wheel-drive (front-wheel-drive), and use either a 5- or 6-speed sequential gearbox. They weigh between  including the driver, depending on how many valves per cylinder the engine has. They are capable of a  time in just under 4.5 seconds.

Electric

They are also four-wheel-drive, and weigh .

Projekt E used electric powertrain kits supplied by STARD. The first car used a Ford Fiesta bodyshell; the STARD ElectRX was a three-motor, all-wheel drive car with  combined output.

Points system
Points are scored as follows:

2014-2021 World Championship points were scored as follows:

A red background denotes drivers who did not advance from the round

Drivers

Events

Results
Records correct up to and including the 2022 World RX of Germany.

Champions

Statistics

Event wins by driver

Key

Event podiums by driver

Event wins by car

Event wins by manufacturer

See also
FIA European Rallycross Championship
Dirt Rally, the first videogame to be an officially licensed FIA World Rallycross Championship game.

References

External links

 

 
Recurring sporting events established in 2014